Porcari is a surname. Notable people with the surname include:

 Filippo Porcari (born 1984), Italian footballer 
 Giovanni dei Porcari (died 1486), Roman Catholic prelate 
 John Porcari (born 1958), American government official
 Matías Porcari (born 1986), Argentine football midfielder 
 Stefano Porcari (early 15th century–1453), Italian politician and humanist

See also
 Porcaro, town in Italy
 Porcaro (surname)

Italian-language surnames